Josef Laurenz Kunz (1 April 1890 – 5 August 1970) was an Austrian American jurist. He was a Professor of International Law at the University of Toledo from 1934 to 1960, after having emigrated from Austria in 1932. Kunz earned his doctorate degree in 1920 from the University of Vienna, where he was a student of Hans Kelsen.

References 

1890 births
1970 deaths
Austrian jurists
University of Vienna alumni
American people of Austrian-Jewish descent
Jewish emigrants from Nazi Germany to the United States
University of Toledo faculty